Sherrod Farm is a historic plantation house located near Hamilton, Martin County, North Carolina. The main part of the "L"-shaped dwelling is a two-story, five bay, single pile, Federal style center-hall plan frame dwelling dated to the first quarter of the 19th century. The one-story pedimented Ionic order portico was added about 1843 and is in a vernacular Greek Revival style.  The two-bay one-story Georgian rear ell was raised to two stories in the late-19th century.

It was added to the National Register of Historic Places in 1984.

References

Plantation houses in North Carolina
Houses on the National Register of Historic Places in North Carolina
Greek Revival houses in North Carolina
Federal architecture in North Carolina
Georgian architecture in North Carolina
Houses in Martin County, North Carolina
National Register of Historic Places in Martin County, North Carolina